Magoosh (a play on the Old Persian word magush, which refers to a wise person and this word also represents Iranian origin) is an American online test preparation and study abroad counselling company based in Berkeley, California that educates students through audio/video lessons, practice test questions, and online email support.

Magoosh provides test preparation materials and counselling  for the competitive exams, such as GRE, GMAT, TOEFL, SAT, ACT, LSAT, MCAT, IELTS and Praxis and aims to make test preparation more enjoyable, affordable, and effective. The company also has free mobile apps for both iPhone and Android.

History 
Magoosh was founded in 2009 by Hansoo Lee, Bhavin Parikh, Pejman Pour-Moezzi and Vikram Shenoy while they were students at the Haas School of Business at UC Berkeley.

In June 2009, Magoosh released its first product—GMAT math practice questions with video explanations. They got their first paying customers a couple months later in August.

Over the next two years, as Magoosh's customer base began to expand, the GMAT product and the Magoosh team continued to grow. Pejman stepped away from the business in 2010, to pursue other opportunities but remained on the board. Hansoo and Bhavin hired two full-time employees and, with them on board, developed a new prep program for the GRE. In August 2011, Magoosh launched their 'New GRE' product for the revised GRE and later renamed it 'Magoosh GRE' once the reformatted GRE became standard.

In December 2011, Magoosh gave away 800 free SAT accounts to high school students through partnerships with Bay Area non-profit organizations. It was also around this time that Bhavin's co-founder Hansoo Lee was diagnosed with a rare case of non-smokers' lung cancer and had to remove himself from daily operations.

In March 2013, shortly after Magoosh hit profitability, Hansoo Lee died of cancer at the age of 35.  Bhavin Parikh and former co-founder Pejman Pour-Moezzi, along with Lee's fiancée Wendy Lim, founded The Hansoo Lee Fellowship for Entrepreneurs, which is used each year to support Haas MBA students wishing to pursue their entrepreneurial ventures full-time.

After Hansoo's passing, Bhavin became the CEO and the only remaining co-founder of Magoosh. The company continued to grow, launching full preparation products for the TOEFL and SAT from late 2013 to 2014. In 2015, it launched full prep programs for the ACT, LSAT and Praxis exams. And in 2016, the company launched a full MCAT product. To date, Magoosh has about 30 in-office employees at its offices in downtown Berkeley and more than 1.5 million students have used Magoosh's web and mobile apps to prepare for standardized exams. The company has been ranked by Inc. magazine as one of the fastest-growing companies in the U.S. and by Entrepreneur magazine as one of the best entrepreneurial companies in America.

Recognition 
San Francisco Business Times No. 21 Fastest-Growing Private Company in the Bay Area (2016) 
Entrepreneur 360 No. 111 Best Entrepreneurial Company in the U.S. (2016)
Inc. 500 No. 186 Fastest-Growing Private Company in the U.S. (2016)
Localwise Best Employer: Education (2016)
San Francisco Business Times No. 5 Fastest-Growing Private Company in the Bay Area / No. 2 Fastest Growing Company in the East Bay (2015)
TINYpulse Happiest Company in Education (2015, 2017)
 Intel Foundation Entrepreneurial Award (2010)
 North Bridge Venture Partners Competition (2010)
 UC Berkeley Center for Entrepreneurship and Technology Venture Lab Competition (2009)

References 

Test preparation companies
Standardized tests in the United States
Educational software companies
Software companies based in the San Francisco Bay Area
Virtual learning environments
Companies based in Berkeley, California
2009 establishments in California
Education companies established in 2009
Software companies established in 2009